This is a list of people with the given name Matthew (sometimes shortened to Matt):

List
 Pope Matthew of Alexandria (disambiguation), multiple people
 Saint Matthew, one of the twelve apostles of Jesus

A
 Matthew Adams (American football) (born 1995), American football player
 Matthew Adler (born 1962), American law professor
 Matthew Algie (1810–1902), British coffee roaster
 Matt Anderson (disambiguation), multiple people
 Matthew Anoa'i (1970–2017), American professional wrestler better known as Rosey and member of Anoa'i family

B
 Matthew Barzun, American political 
 Matthew Batten (born 1995), American baseball player
 Mat Baynton (born 1980), English actor and musician 
 Mat Beard (disambiguation), several people
 Matt Bellamy (born 1978), English musician
 Matt Bennett (born 1991), American actor
 Matthew Bergeron (born 2000), Canadian gridiron player
 Matt Berry (born 1974), English actor
 Matthew Betz (1881–1938), American film actor
 Matthew Blaise, Nigerian queer rights activist
 Matthew Boling, US sprinter, US HS 100m record holder
 Matt Bomer (born 1977), American actor
 Matthew Boulton (1728-1809), British manufacturer
 Matthew Boyd (disambiguation), multiple people
 Matthew Brady (disambiguation), multiple people
 Matt Brown (disambiguation), multiple people
 Matthew Brettingham (1699–1769), English architect
 Matthew Broderick (born 1962), American film and stage actor

C
Matt Centrowitz, middle-distance runner, US Olympic Gold Medalist in 2016 Rio 1500m
Matthew Cheung, Hong Kong Chief Secretary for Administration
 Matthew Cooper (disambiguation), multiple people
 Matthew Cowley, American Latter-day Saint apostle

D
 Matthew Daddario (born 1987), American actor
 Matt Damon (born 1970), American actor
 Matt Darwin (born 1963), American football player
 Matthew Davies (disambiguation), multiple people
 Matthew Davis (disambiguation), multiple people
 Matthew Dayes (born 1994), American football player
 Matthew Deane (born 1978), Thai singer, actor and television presenter
 Matthew Dellavedova (born 1990), Men Basketball
 Matt Duchene (born 1991), Canadian ice hockey player
 Mathew Dumba (born 1994), Canadian ice hockey player
 Matthew Dunn (born 1973), Australian freestyle and medley swimmer

E
Matthew Earnest (born 1969), American theater director
Matthew George Easton (1823–1894), Scottish Presbyterian preacher and writer
Matthew Ebden (born 1987), Australian professional tennis player
Matthew of Edessa (died 1144), Armenian historian
Matthew Edgar (born 1986), English professional darts player
Matthew Edison, Canadian actor
Matthew Edwards (footballer) (1882–1944), footballer
Matthew Egan (born 1983), former Australian rules footballer
Matthew Ehlers, American film director, producer, and screenwriter
Matthew Elderfield (born 1966), Deputy Governor and Head of Financial Regulation at the Central Bank of Ireland
Matthew van Eldik, Paralympic athletics competitor from Australia
Matthew Elias (born 1979), Welsh athlete, specialised in the 400 m sprint and 400 m hurdles
Matthew Elliott (cricketer) (born 1971), Australian former cricketer
Matthew Elliott (footballer) (born 1968), former professional footballer
Matthew Elliott (loyalist) (1739–1814), born in County Donegal, Ireland, died in Burlington, Ontario
Matthew Elliott (politics) (born 1978), British political strategist and lobbyist
Matthew Elliott (rugby league) (born 1964), Australian professional rugby league football coach and former player
Matthew Ellis (American musician) of A Hope for Home in Portland, Oregon
Matthew Ellis (police commissioner), the Conservative Staffordshire Police and Crime Commissioner
Scott Matthew Emerson (born 1971), American professional baseball player, coach and pitching instructor
Matthew Emerton (born 1971), Australian mathematician, professor of mathematics at the University of Chicago
Matthew Gault Emery (1818–1901), the twenty-first Mayor of Washington, D.C.
Matthew Emmons (born 1981), American rifle shooter
Matthew Engel (born 1951), British writer, journalist and editor
Matthew England, physical oceanographer and climate scientist
J. Matthew Ennis (1864–1921), English pianist and organist with an academic career in Adelaide, South Australia
Matthew Entenza (born 1961), Minnesota lawyer and former politician
Matthew Erickson, Canadian voice actor who works for Ocean Studios and Blue Water Studios
Matthew Etherington (born 1981), English former footballer
Harold Matthew Evans (1928–2020), British-born journalist and writer, editor of The Sunday Times
Matthew Evans (cricketer) (born 1974), former English cricketer
Matthew Evers (born 1976), American pair skater, model and TV personality
Matthew Ewing (1815–1874), American carpenter and inventor
Matthew Eyles (born 1979), English cricketer
Matthew J. Eyring (born 1933), American educational administrator, author, and religious leader

F
 Matthew Festa (born 1993), American baseball player
 Matthew Fletcher (disambiguation), multiple people
 Matthew Flinders (1774–1814), English navigator and cartographer
Matthew Forgues, American racewalker
 Matthew Fox (born 1966), American actor and model

G
 Matthew Good (born 1971), Canadian rock musician
 Matthew Goode (born 1978), English actor
 Matthew Gray Gubler (born 1980), American actor
 Matthew Griswold (governor) (1715–1799), Governor of Connecticut 
 Matthew Groening (born 1954), American cartoonist

H
 Matthew Hale (disambiguation), multiple people
 Matthew Harris (disambiguation), multiple people
 Matthew Hayden (born 1971), Australian cricketer
 Mattew Kiichi Heafy (born 1986), American musician
 Matty Healy (born 1989), British rock musician
 Matthew Henry (1662–1714), Welsh Nonconformist minister and author
 Matthew Henson (1866–1955), African-American Arctic explorer
 Matthew Herbert (born 1972), British electronic musician
 Matthew Hoggard (born 1976), English cricketer
 Matthew Hopkins (1620-1647), English Witch-hunting
 Matthew Hughes (badminton) (born 1978), Welsh badminton player
 Matt Hughes (writer) (born 1949), Canadian author
 Matt Hughes (MMA) (born 1973), Retired MMA Fighter

I
Matthew Ianniello (1920-2012), of the Genovese crime family
Matthew Illingsworth (born 1968), is a road and track racing cyclist
Matthew Inabinet (born 1984), Australian sport shooter
Matthew Inman (born 1982), cartoonist, creator of The Oatmeal webcomic and humor website
Matthew Innes MA, FRHS, is Vice Master and Professor of History at Birkbeck College, University of London
Matthew Irmas, American director and producer
Matthew Irwin (born 1987), Canadian professional ice hockey player
Matthew Iserhoff of CerAmony, a Canadian duo musical band of Cree origin from Whapmagoostui
Matthew II Izmirlian (1845–1910), Catholicos of All Armenians of the Armenian Apostolic Church

J
 Matthew Johns (born 1971), Australian rugby league football commentator and player
 Matthew Judon (born 1992), American football player

K
 Matthew Kennedy (disambiguation), multiple people
 Matthew of Kraków (c. 1335–1410), German-Polish scholar and priest
Matthew Kenseth- 2003 NASCAR Cup Series champion

L
 Matthew Lawrence (born 1980), American actor
 Matthew Levatich (born 1964/65), American businessman, CEO of Harley-Davidson
 Matthew Lewis (disambiguation), multiple people
 Matthew Liberatore (born 1999), American baseball player
 Matthew Lillard (born 1970), American actor
 Matthew Lloyd (disambiguation), multiple people
 Matthew B. Lowrie, American political
Matthew Lyon, American politician

M
 Matthew Macfadyen (born 1974), British theatre and film actor
 Matthew Marsden (born 1973), English actor
 Matthew Fontaine Maury, Commodore of the United States navy
 Matthew McCloskey, American political 
 Matthew McConaughey (born 1969), American actor
 Matthew McEwen (born 1971), Australian decathlete
 Matthew Mervis (born 1998), American baseball player
 Matthew Mileham (born 1976), British hammer thrower
 Matthew Miller (disambiguation), multiple people
 Matthew Modine (born 1959), American actor
 Matt Moore (disambiguation), multiple people
 Matthew Morrison (born 1978), American actor, dancer, and singer-songwriter
 Matthew Saad Muhammad (1954-2014), professional boxer
 Matthew Murphy (born 1984), English musician; lead vocalist & guitarist of The Wombats
 Matt Murray (born 1994), Canadian ice hockey goaltender
 Matthew Murray (1765–1826), English steam engine and machine tool manufacturer
 Matthew Myers (judge), Australian judge

N
Matthew M. Neely American political

O
Matthew Oakley (born 1977), English retired professional footballer
Olusegun Aremu Okikiola Matthew Obasanjo (born 1937), President of Nigeria from 1999 to 2007
Matthew O'Brien, American author, journalist and teacher
Matthew O'Callaghan, American film director, animator, writer, and storyboard artist
John Matthew O'Connell (1872–1941), U.S. Representative from Rhode Island
Matthew O'Connor (soccer) (born 1984), Canadian former soccer player
Matthew O'Connor (swimmer) (born 1971), British former competitive swimmer
Matthew O'Conor (1773–1844), Irish historian, the O'Conor Don and de jure King of Connacht
Matthew Odell, American pianist
Matthew Odmark (born 1974), American musician,a guitarist for Christian alternative folk rock group Jars of Clay
Matthew O'Donnell MA, BD, DPh was an Irish priest, president of St. Patrick's College, Maynooth
Matthew O'Dwyer (born 1988), Australian rules footballer
Matthew Offord, FRGS (born 1969), British Conservative Party politician and the Member of Parliamentn
Matthew Ogens, American film director, creative director, photographer and artist
Matthew O'Hanlon (born 1991), Irish sportsperson
Matthew Okohh (born 1972), former U.S.–Nigerian soccer player
Matthew O'Leary (born 1987), American actor
Matthew Olim, CEO and co-founder of CDNow, Inc.
Matthew G. Olsen (born 1962), American prosecutor and the former Director of the National Counterterrorism Center (NCTC)
Matthew Olson, retired American soccer goalkeeper
Matthew Vincent O'Malley (1878–1931), U.S. Representative from New York in 1931
Matthew O'Neill (footballer) (born 1984), English professional footballer
Matthew Oram MBE (1885–1969), New Zealand politician of the National Party
Matthew O'Reilly (1880–1962), Irish politician
Matthew O'Rourke (born 1967), New Zealand former cricketer
Matthew Orr (born 1962), entrepreneur living in the UK
Matthew D. Orwig (born 1959), American attorney
Albert Matthew Osborne GC (1906–1942), awarded a posthumous George Cross for action during German air attacks on Malta
Matthew O'Shea, the Alderman of the 19th ward of Chicago
Matthew Osman (born 1983), Australian former professional footballer
Matthew Otten (born 1981), American former professional basketball player
John Matthew Ottoson (1818–1867), Japanese castaway originally from the area of Onoura near modern-day Mihama

P
 Matthew Parker (1504–1575), English Archbishop of Canterbury
 Matthew Paris (c. 1200–1259), Benedictine monk, English chronicler, artist in illuminated manuscripts and cartographer
 Matthew Parris (born 1949), British journalist and politician
 Matthew Patrick (born 1986), American YouTuber
 Matthew Perry (born 1969), American-Canadian actor and writer
 Matthew C. Perry (1794–1858), Commodore of the United States Navy
 Matthew Prior (disambiguation), multiple people
 Matthew Pinsent (born 1970), English rower and broadcaster
 Matt Preston (born 1961), English-born Australian food critic, cravat enthusiast and television personality

Q
Matthew Quay (1833-1904), American political boss
Matthew Quick (born 1973), American writer of adult and young adult fiction
Matthew Quick (artist) (born 1967), Australian artist
Matthew Quinn (bishop) DD (1821–1885), an Australian Roman Catholic suffragan bishop
Matthew Quinn (cricketer) (born 1993), New Zealand first-class cricketer
Matthew Quintal (1766–1799), Cornish able seaman and mutineer aboard HMS Bounty

R
 Matthew Reilly (born 1974), Australian action thriller writer
 Matthew Richardson (disambiguation), multiple people
 Matthew Ridgway (1895–1993),  senior United States Army officer
 Matthew Robinson (disambiguation), multiple people
 Matthew Ryan (disambiguation), multiple people

S
 Matt Sanchez (born 1970), American journalist
 Matthew Charles Sanders (born 1981), known by his stage name M. Shadows, American musician
 Matthew Saville, Australian television and film director
 Matthew J. Saville, New Zealand actor and filmmaker, director of Juniper
 Matt Schwartz (born 1971), British DJ
 Matthew Shepard (1976–1998), American murder victim
 Matthew Silverman (born 1976), American General Manager and President for Baseball Operations for the Tampa Bay Rays
 Matthew Simpson (1811–1884), American bishop of the Methodist Episcopal Church
 Matthew Slater (born 1985), American football gunner New England Patriots 
 Matthew Smith (disambiguation), multiple people
 Matthew Stafford (born 1988), American football Quarterback for the Los Angeles Rams
 Matthew Stevens (born 1977), Welsh professional snooker player
 Matthew Stone (born 1971), American animator and producer
 Matthew Sturgis, British historian and biographer
 Matthew Sutcliffe (1550?-1629), English 
 Matthew Sweet (born 1964), American rock singer-songwriter and musician

T
 Matthew Taylor (disambiguation), multiple people
 Matthew Thiessen (born 1980), Canadian-American musician, singer and songwriter
 Matthew Thomas (linebacker) (born 1995), American football player
 Matthew Tuck (born 1980), Welsh musician
 Matthew Turner (disambiguation), multiple people

U
Matthew Updike, American Paralympic cyclist
Matthew Upson (born 1979), English former professional footballer
Matthew Utai (born 1981), professional rugby league footballer
Matthew Uttley FRHistS FRSA (born 1965), British academic and writer
Matthew Uy (born 1990), American born Filipino footballer

V
Matthew Vandrau (born 1969), retired English-born South African-raised cricketer
Matthew VanDyke (born 1979), American documentary filmmaker, revolutionary, and former journalist
Matthew Vaniel (1919–1981), American professional basketball player
Philip Michael Matthew Scott VanKoughnet, QC (1822–1869), Canadian politician, lawyer and judge
Jason Matthew Vargas (born 1983), American professional baseball pitcher
Matthew Edward Vasgersian (born 1967), American sportscaster and television host
Matthew Vassar (1792–1868), English-born American brewer, merchant and philanthropist
Matthew Vaughn (born 1971), English film producer, director, and screenwriter
Matthew Vellanickal (born 1934), New Testament scholar, vicar general of the Syro-Malabar Catholic Archdiocese of Changanassery
Matthew of Vendôme, French author of the 12th century, writing in Latin, who had been was a pupil of Bernard Silvestris at Tours
Emil Matthew Verban (1915–1989), second baseman in Major League Baseball
Matthew Villanueva (born 1987), American professional boxer of Cuban and Puerto Rican descent
Matthew Villis (born 1984), English footballer
Adam Matthew Vinatieri (born 1972), American football placekicker for the Indianapolis Colts
Matthew Vines (born 1990), LGBT activist, known for the viral YouTube video The Gay Debate: The Bible and Homosexuality

W
 Matthew Walker (disambiguation), multiple people
 Matthew Waterhouse (born 1961), English actor and writer
 Matthew Webb, first man to swim the English channel unaided
 Matthew Wells (American football) (born 1990), American football player
 Matthew West (born 1977), American contemporary Christian musician, singer-songwriter, and actor
 Matthew Wood (disambiguation), multiple people
 Matthew Williams (disambiguation), multiple people
 Matthew Wright (disambiguation), multiple people

X
 Matthew Xia, disc jockey

Y
 Matthew Young (disambiguation), multiple people

Z
Matthew Zell (1477–1548), Lutheran pastor and reformer based in Strasbourg
Matthew Zeremes, Australian actor known for his television, theatre and film roles
Matthew Ziff (born 1991), American actor and producer
Matthew A. Zimmerman, USA (born 1941), retired American Army officer
Matthew Zions (born 1978), Australian professional golfer
Matthew Zone, Cleveland, Ohio city councilman
Matthew Zook, American geographer and professor in the University of Kentucky
Matthew Zunic (1919–2006), American basketball player and coach
John Matthew Zwach (1907–1990), United States Representative from Minnesota

Fictional characters
Matthew "Matt" Cordell, main antagonist and centerpiece of the Maniac Cop trilogy
Matthew "Matt" McNamara, on the American TV series Nip/Tuck
Matthew "Matt" Murdock, a.k.a. Daredevil of Earth-616 from the Marvel Comics
Matthew "Matt" Murdock, a.k.a. Kingpin of Earth-65 from the Marvel Comics
Matthew "Matt" Parkman, in American TV series Heroes
Matthew "Matt" Robinson, on Australian soap opera Neighbours
Matthew "Matt" Saracen, in American TV series Friday Night Lights
Matthew "Matt" Simmons, a protagonist of American TV series Criminal Minds
Matthew "Matt" Taylor, one of the protagonists of the Until Dawn video game
Matthew Fairchild, one of the protagonists of Cassandra Clare's Last Hours trilogy

Matthew